Stacey Hayes (born 10 August 1976) is an English television infomercial spokesperson, comedian, actress, model and one-time competitive ice-skater. She was born in London, England and raised in Nebraska, United States.

Career

She has appeared in many magazines, television shows and movies including soap operas such as Days of Our Lives and The Young and the Restless, as well as primetime shows such as Las Vegas and Boston Legal. She has also tried her hand at stand-up comedy work at The Comedy Store, which helped her join as co-host for the 3rd season of Chuck Woolery's Lingo.

Recently, she has periodically made cameo appearances in Spike TV's show MANswers. She also appears as a pitchperson with model/actress Carmen Palumbo on internet entrepreneur/television personality Jeff Paul's Internet Millions infomercial nationally, as well as other "get rich quick" infomercials as of late 2010.

Partial filmography

Television
 Cry Wolfe (1 episode, 2015) as Victoria
 Official Best of (2 episodes, 2011–2012) as Host
 MANswers (7 episodes, 2007–2008) as Hottie On Treadmill / Pretty Woman / Hot Blonde Girl / Beach Babe / Watermelon's / Massage Therapist / Nagging Girl
 Boston Legal (1 episode, 2006) as Model #1
 Gene Simmons Family Jewels (1 episode, 2006) as Dancer
 Las Vegas (1 episode, 2005) as Porn Star
 Howard Stern (2 episodes, 2005) as herself
 Casting Ripe Live (2005) as Co-Host
 The Captain and Casey Show (1 episode, 2004) as Sexy Drink Girl
 Lingo (65 episodes, 2003–2004) as Co-Host
 The Real Roseanne Show (1 episode, 2003) as Model
 Passions (2 episodes, 2002) as Maid / Clerk
 Talk Soup (1 episode, 2001) as Unknown
 Pajama Party (13 episodes, 2000) as Dancer
 The Tonight Show with Jay Leno (1 episode, 2000) as Miss Texas
 Later (1 episode, 2000) as Lotto Girl
 Sunset Beach (2 episodes, 1999) as Flight Attendant

Film
 Ghosts of the Abyss (2003) as herself (voice)
 Sunset Strip (2000) as Groupie (uncredited)
 Gun Shy (2000) as Hot Girl (uncredited)
 The Debtors  (1999) as Sexy Casino Waitress

Video game
 Cy Girl (2004) (VG) as Coffy (voice)
 Road Rash  (1997) (VG) as Racing Driver #5 / Trophy Awarding #4 (voice)

References

External links
Stacey's Official Website
Stacey's Official Facebook Page

Actresses from Nebraska
1976 births
English female models
English people of Irish descent
English television actresses
English soap opera actresses
Living people
Actresses from London
English emigrants to the United States
21st-century American women